Full Throttle: All-American Racing, known in Japan as , is a racing video game released for the SNES.

Gameplay
Players can race using motorcycles or waterscooters. Six racers can be controlled by the human player. Places visited in the game include the Appalachian Mountains, San Francisco's elaborate streets, and Arizona's flat wasteland deserts.

An unusual aspect of the game was that the player has the choice between playing the game with music only, or sound effects only. It is not possible to play the game with both at the same time.

Reception
In their review, GamePro described Full Throttle: All-American Racing as a thoroughly average racer, with derivative gameplay and so-so controls, graphics, music, and sound effects.

References

1994 video games
Coconuts Japan games
Cybersoft (video game company) games
GameTek games
Gremlin Interactive games
Racing video games set in the United States
Super Nintendo Entertainment System games
Super Nintendo Entertainment System-only games
Vehicular combat games
Video games set in Arizona
Video games set in San Francisco
Multiplayer and single-player video games
Video games developed in the United Kingdom